MagneRide is an automotive adaptive suspension with magnetorheological damper system developed by the Delphi Automotive corporation, during a period when the company was a subsidiary of General Motors (GM), that uses magnetically controlled dampers, or shock absorbers, for a highly adaptive ride. As opposed to traditional suspension systems, MagneRide has no mechanical valves or even small moving parts that can wear out. This system consists of four monotube dampers, one on each corner of the vehicle, a sensor set, and an ECU (electronic control unit) to maintain the system.

Background

The dampers are filled with magnetorheological fluid, a mixture of easily magnetized iron particles in a synthetic hydrocarbon oil. In each of the monotube dampers is a piston containing two electromagnetic coils and two small fluid passages through the piston. The electromagnets are able to create a variable magnetic field across the fluid passages. When the magnets are off, the fluid travels through the passages freely. When the magnets are turned on, the iron particles in the fluid create a fibrous structure through the passages in the same direction as the magnetic field. The strength of the bonds between the magnetized iron particles causes the effective viscosity of the fluid to increase resulting in a stiffer suspension. Altering the strength of the current results in an instantaneous change in force of the piston. If the sensors sense any body roll, they communicate the information to the ECU. The ECU will compensate for this by changing the strength of the current to the appropriate dampers.

Differentiating features

Low-velocity damping control
Ability to "draw" force-velocity curve
Fast response

History

The first generation was created by Delphi Corporation during a period when it was a subsidiary of General Motors (GM), and debuted on the 2002.5 Cadillac Seville STS. The first sports car to use the technology was the 2003 C5 Corvette. The piston inside these dampers contained a single electromagnetic coil.

Improvements 

Generation II MagneRide continued to use a single electromagnetic coil inside the damper piston. Changes from the previous generation include uprated seals and bearings to extend its application to heavier cars and SUV's. The most notable improvements in the new system are the ECU and coils.
A smaller, lighter, more capable ECU debuted with GenII

The legislative requirement for lead-free ECU's caused BWI to redesign their control unit for the third generation. Because they could not use lead, BWI designed their new ECU from scratch. The new and improved ECU has three times the computing capacity as the previous edition as well as ten times more memory. It also has greater tuneability.

Dual coils

The third generation introduced a second electromagnetic coil in the piston of each damper, improving turn-off response. With the single electromagnetic coil, there was a small delay from when the ECU turned off the current to when the damper lost its magnetic field. This was caused by a temporary electric current, or eddy current, in the electromagnet. BWI greatly reduced this delay with its dual coil system. The two coils are wound in opposite directions to each other, cancelling out the eddy currents. The dual coil system effectively eliminated the delay, causing a quicker responding suspension system.

Applications

MagneRide was first used by General Motors in the Cadillac Seville STS (2002.5) sedan, first used in a sports car in the 2003 C5 Corvette, and is now used as a standard suspension or an option in many models for Cadillac, Buick, Chevrolet, and other GM vehicles. It can also be found on some Holden Special Vehicles, Ferrari, Ford and Audi vehicles.

Specific Applications:

Buick Lucerne: CXS trim; Lucerne Super
Chevrolet Camaro in ZL1 trim (2012–) and SS trim (2016–) with optional package
Chevrolet Corvette C5: Standard equipment on 2003 50th anniversary model, optional on 2003-2004 model years 
Chevrolet Corvette C6: optional in coupe trim starting in 2005 model year and in hardtop (Z06) trim starting in 2012 model year; standard equipment in ZR1.
Chevrolet Corvette C7: Optional with Z51 package, standard on Z06 and ZR1
Chevrolet SS (2015-2017)
Cadillac XLR and Cadillac XLR-V (2004–2009) standard on all models
Cadillac ATS and Cadillac ATS-V (2013–): standard with 3.6L or 2.0T option package
Cadillac CT4-V (2020–): standard on CT4-V
Cadillac CT5-V (2020–): fourth generation Magnetic Ride Control standard on CT5-V
Cadillac CTS and Cadillac CTS-V (2009–) (Magnetic Ride Control)
Cadillac CT6 (2016–): standard on Platinum, optional on other models except PHEV
Cadillac Escalade (2008-): standard
Cadillac SRX (2004–09): standard with Performance or Premium option package.
Cadillac DTS (2006–11): standard with Performance or Premium option package.
Cadillac STS (2005–11): standard with Northstar V8 and 1SG option package.
Cadillac Seville STS (2002–03): Debut application for MagneRide, replacing Continuously Variable Road-Sensing Suspension (CVRSS).
GMC Sierra (Denali Trim) (2015-)
GMC Yukon and Yukon XL (LTZ Trim) (2015-)
Ford Mustang Ecoboost (2018–): Optional in Performance Package (2018–2019); Standard in Handling Package, which requires High Performance Package (2020–)
Ford Mustang GT (2018–): Optional in Performance Package, Standard in Performance Package Level 2
Ford Mustang Bullit (2018–): Optional
Ford Mustang Shelby GT350 (2015–) and GT500 (2019–): Standard
Ford Mustang Mach-E: GT Performance Edition

HSV Senator
HSV GTS
HSV W427
Acura MDX Sport Package
Acura ZDX
Acura NSX
Audi TT (magnetic ride)
Audi S3 (magnetic ride)
Audi R8 (magnetic ride)
Land Rover Discovery Sport
Land Rover Range Rover Evoque
Ferrari 599
Ferrari F12berlinetta
Ferrari California
Ferrari FF
Ferrari 458 Italia
Ferrari La Ferrari
Ferrari Roma
Lamborghini Aventador

References

External links
 BWI Group
 MagneRide Company
 "BWI wraps up Delphi deal", China Daily

Automotive suspension technologies
Automotive technology tradenames
Vehicle safety technologies
Auto parts
Mechanical power control